Abbasabad (also Romanized as ‘Abbāsābād; also known as Bedām) is a village in Esfandaqeh Rural District, in the Central District of Jiroft County, Kerman Province, Iran. At the 2006 census, its population was 185, in 31 families.

References 

Populated places in Jiroft County